Haley Hannah Heynderickx (born May 28, 1993) is an American singer-songwriter from Portland, Oregon. In 2016, she released her debut EP, Fish Eyes. Her first full-length album, I Need to Start a Garden, was released in March 2018 on Mama Bird Recording Co.

Early life
Heynderickx was born in Stockton, California to a Filipino-American family and grew up in Forest Grove, Oregon, where she learned to sing in church. She graduated from Portland State University.

Career
She released her debut EP, Fish Eyes, in 2016. In March 2018, she released her first album, I Need to Start a Garden, on Mama Bird Recording Co. The album received positive reviews, including a 7.3 rating from Pitchfork, while NPR Music wrote that the album "captivates" and Uproxx called it "an utterly brilliant folk debut". In January 2018, she was named an "Artist to Watch" by Stereogum.

Style
Heynderickx's music features a fingerstyle acoustic guitar technique inspired by Leo Kottke and John Fahey paired with introspective lyrics punctuated with "well-timed levity".

Discography
Albums
 I Need to Start a Garden (March 2, 2018)
EPs
 Among Horses III (October 5, 2018)
Unpeeled (Banana Stand) (March 17, 2017)
 Fish Eyes (January 29, 2016)

References

External links
 Official website

1993 births
Living people
21st-century American singers
American Christians
American women singer-songwriters
American musicians of Filipino descent
Feminist musicians
Musicians from Portland, Oregon
Singer-songwriters from Oregon
21st-century American women singers
Musicians from Stockton, California
People from Forest Grove, Oregon
Portland State University alumni
Singer-songwriters from California